Irrunytju Arts is an Indigenous Australian art centre based in the community of Irrunytju (Wingellina), Western Australia. Irrunytju is situated near the tri-state border of the Northern Territory, Western Australia and South Australia, approximately 720km south-west of Alice Springs. The landscape is arid, dry and very remote. The Irrunytju artists and their families will often travel through the country of their ancestors to hunt for food, collect plants for bush medicine, and grass and seeds for basket weaving and jewellery making.

The Irrunytju art centre was established in 2001. Before this, some of the community members were already producing paintings. But when the art centre was opened, many community members attended daily to paint their tjukurpa (dreamtime) stories.

Irrunytju Arts is now well established and the artists are known for producing vibrant and colourful canvases which depict a variety of tjukurpa, heavily related to the landscape of the surrounding country and its history. Some Irrunytju artists, particularly Yannima Tommy Watson, are represented in prominent private and public collections, both in Australia and internationally.

The art centre has supported over 30 artists, including Wingu Tingima, Alkawari Dawson, Patju Presley and Yannima Tommy Watson (who now works independently), as well as Jorna Newberry, Kuntjil Cooper, Karrika Belle Davidson, Ivy Laidlaw, Tjayanka Woods, Myra Cook, Anmanari Brown, Angampa Martin and Roma Butler.

Australian Aboriginal art